Irving Cottler (February 13, 1918 – August 8, 1989), a Hollywood, Los Angeles-based musician, was a first-call drummer/percussionist and original member of The Wrecking Crew. Cottler's credits include "Love", "Impossible", "Stardust", and "Unforgettable" recorded with Nat King Cole. Cottler also recorded and performed live with Louis Armstrong, Bing Crosby, Walt Disney, Peggy Lee, Dinah Shore, Ella Fitzgerald, Neal Hefti, Nelson Riddle, Count Basie, and many others.

In the early 1950s, Cottler was the drummer for the NBC live broadcasts from Hollywood, and for The Dinah Shore Show. Frank Sinatra made an appearance on the show and loved Cottler's distinctive sound. Sinatra offered Cottler double what NBC was paying him. Beginning in 1955, Cottler went on to perform as the drummer and percussionist on dozens of hit songs for multiple artists, including "Love Is Here to Stay", "I've Got You Under My Skin", and "Nice 'n' Easy" with Sinatra. In the early 1960s, Cottler was the drummer and percussionist on many Disney films, including Herbie, The Jungle Book, and Mary Poppins. 

Cottler died of a heart attack in Templeton, California, at the age of 71.

Discography

With Count Basie
Basie's in the Bag (Brunswick, 1967)
With Hoagy Carmichael
Hoagy Sings Carmichael (Pacific Jazz, 1956)
With Sammy Davis Jr
It's All Over but the Swingin' (Decca, 1957)
With Stan Kenton
Kenton / Wagner (Capitol, 1964)
With Barney Kessel
To Swing or Not to Swing (Contemporary, 1955)
With Skip Martin and His Orchestra 
Perspectives in Percussion (Somerset, 1960)
With Andre Previn
 Let's Get Away From It All (Decca, 1955)
With Carly Simon
 Playing Possum (Elektra Records, 1975)

Bibliography

References

External links 

Irving Cottler interview at the National Jazz Archive

American jazz drummers
1918 births
1989 deaths
20th-century American drummers
American male drummers
American male jazz musicians
20th-century American male musicians